Platyphora is a genus of broad-shouldered leaf beetles belonging to the family Chrysomelidae.

These tropical insects usually have bright warning coloration (aposematism) and a chemical protection against predators. The toxins are secondary metabolites collected from the host plants they eat, mainly Boraginaceae, Asteraceae, Asclepiadaceae, Convolvulaceae, Solanaceae and Apocynaceae.

Selected species

References
 Olckers, T. Biology and physiological host range of four species of Platyphora Gistel (Coleoptera: Chrysomelidae) associated with Solanum mauritianum Scop. (Solanaceae) in South America / The Coleopterists Bulletin
 Discover Life
 NCBI
 Universal Biological Indexer
 Institut national de la recherche agronomique

Chrysomelinae
Chrysomelidae genera
Taxa named by Johannes von Nepomuk Franz Xaver Gistel